Phebalium microphyllum is a species of small, rounded shrub that is endemic to Western Australia. It has scaly branchlets, leathery, oblong leaves and yellow flowers arranged in umbels of three to six on the ends of branchlets.

Description
The leaves are glabrous on the upper surface, covered with silvery scales on the lower surface and have slightly wavy edges. Flowering occurs from September to December.

Taxonomy
This species was first formally described in 1852 by Nikolai Turczaninow in the journal Bulletin de la Société Impériale des Naturalistes de Moscou.

Distribution
Phebalium microphyllum grows on undulating plains between Lake Grace and the Fitzgerald River National Park.

Conservation status
This phebalium is classified as "not threatened" by the Government of Western Australia Department of Parks and Wildlife.

References

microphyllum
Flora of Western Australia
Plants described in 1852
Taxa named by Nikolai Turczaninow